List of best selling comics can refer to:

 List of best-selling comic series
 List of best-selling manga

Best-selling